The Carmel Symphony Orchestra is a symphony orchestra based in Carmel, Indiana. In February 2011, the Carmel Symphony became the resident orchestra of the Palladium at the Center for the Performing Arts in Carmel.

In 2010, the symphony recorded with Michael Feinstein on his We Dreamed These Days album, and in 2011 performed alongside Feinstein at the Opening Gala of the Palladium, including guest artists Chris Botti, Dionne Warwick, Cheyenne Jackson and Neil Sedaka. The symphony has performed recently with Angela Brown, the winners of the Indianapolis Violin Competition, Di Wu, Sylvia McNair, Cameron Carpenter, and Dale Clevenger.

Orchestra
The Carmel Symphony Orchestra celebrated its 35th anniversary at the end of the 2010-11 season, and has continuously served the area since its founding in 1975. The Carmel Symphony is a non-profit arts organization with an 85-member orchestra. The Carmel Symphony Orchestra is composed of professional and formally trained musicians.

The symphony plays to more than 50,000 music lovers annually at concerts and large community events such as CarmelFest in Carmel, the Penrod Arts Fair in Indianapolis, Indiana, and an outdoor summer concert at Mallow Run Winery in Bargersville, Indiana.

Education and community service
The Carmel Symphony participates in community service and education programs in Marion County and Hamilton County of central Indiana, including a series of performances for elementary age students called Sounds Exciting! and the annual Young Artist Competition.

Conductors
The current Carmel Symphony Orchestra Music Director and Conductor, Janna Hymes, has been with the organization since the July 2017.

External links
 carmelsymphony.org

References 

American orchestras
Musical groups established in 1976
Carmel, Indiana
Musical groups from Indiana
1976 establishments in Indiana
Performing arts in Indiana